Sekou Bangoura and Michael Mmoh were the defending champions but chose not to defend their title.

Teymuraz Gabashvili and Dennis Novikov won the title after defeating Luke Bambridge and Nathaniel Lammons 7–5, 4–6, [10–8] in the final.

Seeds

Draw

References

External links
 Main draw

Cary Challenger - Doubles
2020 Doubles